Backlash is a 1956 American Western film directed by John Sturges and starring Richard Widmark and Donna Reed.

It was directed by John Sturges (with whom Widmark would also make another Western The Law and Jake Wade), and unfolds in the vein of the psychological Western (a subgenre that has yielded many films, e.g. those of Anthony Mann, with whose films this bears comparison). It delivers an unconventional story, written by Borden Chase, that sometimes crosses into film noir, as a colorful cast of supporting characters help or hinder the protagonist during the unfolding of its central mystery. Backlash was filmed on location at Old Tucson Studios.

Plot
Jim Slater (Richard Widmark) meets Karyl Orton (Donna Reed) in Gila Valley, Arizona. She thinks that he is searching for a gold cache believed to be hidden somewhere in the valley. When a man with a rifle starts shooting at him, Jim wonders if she can be trusted. After Jim kills his foe, he discovers the dead man was a deputy sheriff from Silver City. He takes the body there.

When Sheriff J. C. Marson (Edward Platt) questions him, Jim reveals that he is after the person responsible for his father's death. Jim's father and four other men were besieged and killed by Apaches. Jim believes there was a sixth man who got away and could have gone for help, but instead decided he wanted the gold they found all to himself. Marston reveals that one of the men was the brother of the dead deputy. There are two other brothers, who will want revenge. When Jim refuses to leave town, Marston suggests he go see Sergeant George Lake (Barton MacLane) in Tucson. Lake led the detail that found the massacre victims.

Jim takes his advice, but finds Lake and his men under siege at an isolated trading post. Lake tells Karyl that only three of the bodies could be identified. While there, Karyl stakes her claim to the gold; her husband was another victim of Gila Valley. Lake and Jim sneak out that night and stampede the Apaches' horses, allowing the party to escape. Lake, however, is mortally wounded. Before he dies, he reveals they found a horse bearing the brand of Carson's outfit in Texas.

When Jim returns to Tucson, he encounters Karyl in a hotel, being forced upstairs by a stranger. Karyl calls him by name, whereupon the stranger draws his gun. Jim kills him and wounds another man gunning for him, though he himself is shot in the shoulder. Afterward, Karyl reveals that the dead man is Jeff Welker (Robert J. Wilke) and the survivor his brother Tony (Harry Morgan). Jim slaps her. She tracks him down, tends to his wound, and offers to trade information. Jim kisses her.

When the pair reach their destination, Major Carson (Roy Roberts) tries to recruit Jim against Bonniwell (John McIntire), who has organized the local bandits. Jim is not interested in the upcoming range war, though he does learn that Bonniwell arrived in the region with $60,000, the same amount as the missing gold. One of Carson's gunmen, Johnny Cool (William Campbell), informs Bonniwell of Carson's plans.

Bonniwell gathers his men in town, guns down Sheriff Olson (Robert Foulk) when he tries to keep the peace, and prepares an ambush. He finds Jim locked in the jail. He lets the prisoner out when he learns who he is, then reveals that he is Jim's father, whom Jim had not seen since he was a child. The gold came, not from mining, but via robbery. The others forced Bonniwell out, only to run afoul of the Apaches, leaving him to collect the gold. Disillusioned, Jim wants nothing to do with his father.

Karyl pleads with Jim to leave immediately, but he wants to warn Carson. When he tries to fire a warning shot, he discovers that Bonniwell gave him back an unloaded gun. Bonniwell chases his son with a knife, but Jim manages to wrestle a gun from one of the bandits and fire. Alerted, Carson has his men surround the town, whereupon the bandits panic and flee. Bonniwell offers to step out of hiding and draw to see which Slater is faster, but he treacherously already has his gun in his hand. Carson's men ride in and fatally shoot him just before Jim steps out in the open.

Cast
 Richard Widmark as Jim Slater 
 Donna Reed as Karyl Orton 
 William Campbell as Johnny Cool 
 John McIntire as Jim Bonniwell 
 Barton MacLane as Sergeant Lake 
 Harry Morgan as Tony Welker 
 Robert J. Wilke as Jeff Welker 
 Jack Lambert as Benton 
 Roy Roberts as Major Carson 
 Edward C. Platt as Sheriff Marson
 Robert Foulk as Sheriff Olson 
 Phil Chambers as Dobbs 
 Gregg Barton as Sleepy 
 Fred Graham as Ned McCloud 
 Frank Chase as Cassidy

References

External links
 
 
 
 

1956 films
1956 Western (genre) films
American Western (genre) films
Films based on American novels
Films based on Western (genre) novels
Films directed by John Sturges
Films scored by Herman Stein
Films set in Arizona
Films shot in Tucson, Arizona
Universal Pictures films
1950s English-language films
1950s American films